Trial by fire may refer to:

Law
 Trial by fire (law), a form of trial by ordeal

Film and television

Films
 Trial by Fire, a 1995 television film starring Keith Carradine
 Trial by Fire (2008 film), a Canadian television adventure film
 Trial by Fire (2018 film), an American biographical film about Cameron Todd Willingham

Television episodes
 "Trial by Fire" (The 4400)
 "Trial by Fire" (The A-Team)
 "Trial by Fire" (Fantastic Four: World's Greatest Heroes)
 "Trial by Fire" (The Fugitive)
 "Trial by Fire" (Grimm)
 "Trial by Fire" (The Outer Limits)
 "Trial by Fire" (Shark)
 "Trial by Fire" (Voltron: Legendary Defender)
 "Trial By Fire (Indian web series)" - released in 2023

Games
 Trial by Fire (Judges Guild), a 1981 adventure for fantasy role-playing games
 Quest for Glory II: Trial by Fire, a 1990 video game

Literature
 Trial by Fire (Spence book), a 1986 book by Gerry Spence
 Trial by Fire, a 1992 novel by Harold Coyle
 Trial by Fire (comics), a 2003 CrossGen mini-series
 Trial by Fire, a 2014 book by Charles Gannon

Music

Albums
 Trial by Fire (Journey album), or the title song, 1996
 Trial by Fire (Yelawolf album), or the title song, 2017
 Trial by Fire: Live in Leningrad, by Yngwie J. Malmsteen, 1989
 Trial by Fire, by the Brandos, unreleased (1990)
 Trial by Fire: Greatest and Latest, by Bachman-Turner Overdrive, 1996

Songs
 "Trial by Fire" (song), by Saul, 2019
 "Trial by Fire", by Jefferson Airplane from Long John Silver, 1972
 "Trial by Fire", by Kiss from Asylum, 1985
 "Trial by Fire", by Odette from Herald, 2021
 "Trial by Fire", by Testament from The New Order, 1988